DeAndre Brown (born October 12, 1989) is an American football wide receiver who is currently a free agent. He was signed by the Philadelphia Eagles as an undrafted free agent in 2011. He played college football at Southern Miss. He played high school football at Ocean Springs High School.

College career
Brown made his decision to go to University of Southern Mississippi on National Signing Day. He attended it from 2008 to 2010. As a freshman, he caught 67 passes for 1,117 yards. As a sophomore, he caught 47 passes for 785 yards and nine touchdowns. During his junior year, he played seven of thirteen games, and caught 20 passes for 305 yards and three touchdowns. After a loss in the 2011 Beef 'O' Brady Bowl in St. Petersburg, Florida, he decided to skip his senior season and enter the 2011 NFL Draft.

Professional career

Pre-draft

Philadelphia Eagles
Brown was signed by the Philadelphia Eagles as an undrafted free agent following the 2011 NFL Draft on July 26, 2011. On August 8, Brown was waived by the Eagles.

Knoxville NightHawks
Brown signed with the Knoxville NightHawks of the Professional Indoor Football League (PIFL) for the 2013 season. Brown was named Second-team All-PIFL as an ironman.

New Orleans VooDoo
Brown was assigned to the New Orleans VooDoo of the Arena Football League (AFL) in 2014,

Green Bay Blizzard
On May 19, 2016, Brown was signed by the Green Bay Blizzard. Brown re-signed with the Blizzard on January 30, 2017.

References

External links
Southern Miss Golden Eagles bio 
Arena Football bio

1989 births
Living people
People from Ocean Springs, Mississippi
Players of American football from Mississippi
American football wide receivers
Southern Miss Golden Eagles football players
Philadelphia Eagles players
Knoxville NightHawks players
New Orleans VooDoo players
Green Bay Blizzard players